Events from the year 1621 in France.

Incumbents 
Monarch: Louis XIII

Events
 April 26 – Treaty of Madrid signed by courtier François de Bassompierre: Valtelline restored to the Grisons and Spain allowed to reoccupy Chiavenna.
 May – Huguenot rebellions: Capture of Saumur by Louis XIII.
 May 30 – June 24 – Huguenot rebellions: Siege of Saint-Jean-d'Angély – Royal victory.
 June – Huguenot rebellions: Blockade of La Rochelle begins.
 August – Huguenot rebellions: Siege of Montauban – Louis XIII besieges the Huguenot city of Montauban but is forced to abandon his siege two months later.
 Benedictine Congregation of Saint Maur established.

Births
 July 8 – Jean de La Fontaine, fabulist (died 1695)
 August 13 – Israel Silvestre, topographical etcher (died 1691)
 September 8 – Louis, Grand Condé, general (died 1686)
 October 3 – Claude Maltret, Jesuit (died 1674)
 October 16 – Pierre Paul Puget, painter, sculptor, architect and engineer (died 1694)
 October 21 – Nicholas Barré, French Minim friar, priest and founder (died 1686)
 Françoise Bertaut de Motteville, memoirist (died 1689)
 Jacques Courtois, painter (died 1676)

Deaths
 June 2 – Dorothea of Lorraine (born 1545)
 June 8 – Anne de Xainctonge, religious (born 1567)
 August 3 – Guillaume du Vair, author and lawyer (born 1556)
 September 20 – Henry of Lorraine, Duke of Mayenne, noble (born 1578)
 c. October 8 – Antoine de Montchrestien, dramatist, economist and adventurer (born c.1575)
 October 21 – Paul Phélypeaux de Pontchartrain, French politician (born 1569)
 December 15 – Charles d'Albert, duc de Luynes, Constable of France (born 1578)
 Louis de Caullery, painter (born 1555)
 François Pithou, author and lawyer (born 1543)

See also

References

1620s in France